Əmbərçay (also, Emberchay) is a village and municipality in the Qakh Rayon of Azerbaijan.  It has a population of 531.

References 

Populated places in Qakh District